BEdita is an open source web development framework that features a Content Management System (CMS) out-of-the-box.

Current version is 3.1.5, released on 5 March 2012 under Affero General Public License version 3.
A preview and "unstable" version is also available: 3.2.beta populus, released on 5 March 2012 under the same GPL license.

BEdita is built upon the PHP development framework CakePHP.

Features 

BEdita is both a content management system and a web development framework.

In the words of the authors, BEdita is a "modular framework that features a back-end Content Management System out-of-the-box".

Bedita as a Framework 

BEdita is built upon the well-known PHP development framework CakePHP: as a framework itself, BEdita actually extends CakePHP adding many features through more controllers and helpers and the Smarty templating engine. It also combines some presentation technologies, such as JQuery, with the aim to supply a set of ready to use tools.

From CakePHP BEdita derives the Model–view–controller paradigm: the multi-tier architecture assures the separation of data modelling, data flow/control and its visual presentation.
Inside BEdita every information is stored in an object oriented manner. Upon this abstraction, the developer can build as many custom relations as needed by the project.

Bedita as a CMS 

BEdita is also a complete content management system, since it already comes with a multi-language back office application, able to manage several kinds of data: the CMS presents a number of modules, each related to a type of content.
It is able to handle documents, multimedia objects and galleries, events, news, address books, blogs, bibliographies, newsletters and more out of the box.

All this content is managed in multiple languages, geo-localized and organized through different strategies: hierarchic tree, custom categories and tags.

Releases

A brief history 
For major release 3, BEdita has been rewritten from the ground up: all the previous versions were not publicly available under an open source license.

The very first public release of a version 3 "beta" took place in May 2009.
On 17 November 2009 a stable version of BEdita – 3.0 codename Betula – was released under Affero General Public License version 3, freely downloadable on the official web site www.bedita.com and some common open-source online networks (SourceForge, Freshmeat or Ohloh).

BEdita was created and is currently developed by two Italian companies, ChannelWeb srl and Chialab srl.

List of public official releases

See also
 Free Software licensing
 List of AGPL web applications

References

External links

Official web sites 
 BEdita official web site
 Demo: the backoffice CMS, a test site and a production site
 API documentation
 Community forum
 Presentation slides (downloadable PDF)

Project pages from the open-source network 
 Project page on Google Code with public SVN mirror
 Project page on Sourceforge
 Project page on Freshmeat
 Project page on Ohloh

Third-party publications 
 Features and Requirements on CMSMatrix.org
 Article on blogfreakz.com
 Review and more on HotScripts.com
 Review and ratings on CMSMatch.com

Content management systems
Free content management systems
Free software
Free software programmed in PHP
Web frameworks
Web development software
Software using the GNU AGPL license